Brazil women's junior national softball team is the junior national under-17 team for Brazil. The team competed at the 1999 ISF Junior Women's World Championship in Taipei, Taiwan where they finished tenth.  The team competed at the 2011 ISF Junior Women's World Championship in Cape Town, South Africa where they finished seventh.   The team competed at the 2013 ISF Junior Women's World Championship in Brampton, Ontario where they finished seventh.

References

External links 
 International Softball Federation

Women's national under-18 softball teams
Softball in Brazil
Softball